The 1972 NAIA Division I football season was the 17th season of college football sponsored by the NAIA and the third season of the league's two-division structure.

The season was played from August to November 1972 and culminated in the 1972 NAIA Champion Bowl, played on December 9, 1972 in Commerce, Texas.

East Texas State (now Texas A&M–Commerce) defeated Carson–Newman in the Division I Championship Bowl, 21–18, to win their first NAIA national title.

Conference realignment

Conference changes
 This was the first season of play for the Great Plains Athletic Conference, which consisted of seven former members of the Rocky Mountain Athletic Conference from Colorado, Kansas, and Nebraska.

Membership changes

Conference standings

Postseason

† The game ended in a tie, but Carson–Newman advanced based on having more total penetrations within the 20 yard line.

See also
 1972 NAIA Division II football season
 1972 NCAA University Division football season
 1972 NCAA College Division football season

References

 
NAIA Football National Championship